Artelida nobilitata is a species of beetle in the family Cerambycidae. It was described by Nonfried in 1891.

References

Dorcasominae
Beetles described in 1891